The 2017 Dutch Basketball Supercup was the 7th edition of the Dutch Basketball Supercup. The game was played in the MartiniPlaza in Groningen.

The game featured Donar, the defending champions of the Dutch Basketball League, and Landstede Basketbal, the runner-up of the 2016–17 NBB Cup. Landstede played in its first Supercup game.

Landstede won its first trophy in club history.

Match details

References

Dutch Basketball Supercup
Supercup